Taibbi is a surname. Notable people with the surname include:

 Matt Taibbi (born 1970), American author, journalist, and podcaster
 Mike Taibbi (born  1949), American television journalist

See also
 Taibi